Thoron is a genus of scelionid wasps in the family Scelionidae. There are about 10 described species in Thoron.

Species
These 10 species belong to the genus Thoron:
 Thoron dayi Johnson & Masner, 2004
 Thoron dux Johnson & Masner, 2004
 Thoron garciai Johnson & Masner, 2004
 Thoron gibbus Ruthe, 1859
 Thoron lautus (Masner, 1972)
 Thoron longicornis Masner & Huggert, 1979
 Thoron metallicus Haliday, 1833
 Thoron rex Johnson & Masner, 2004
 Thoron rivalis Johnson & Masner, 2004
 Thoron spinifer Johnson & Masner, 2004

See also
 List of Scelioninae genera

References

Parasitic wasps
Scelioninae